Apteropeda ovulum is a species of flea beetle in the family Chrysomelidae that can be found in western Europe (France, Portugal and Spain) and North Africa (Algeria, Morocco, and Tunisia).

References

Galerucinae
Beetles described in 1807
Beetles of North Africa
Beetles of Europe
Taxa named by Johann Karl Wilhelm Illiger